Vulaines is the name or the partial name of several communes in France:
 Vulaines, in the Aube département;
 Vulaines-lès-Provins, in the Seine-et-Marne département;
 Vulaines-sur-Seine, in the Seine-et-Marne département.